Second-seeded Daphne Akhurst and Jean Borotra won the final on a walkover against the first seeds Esna Boyd and Jack Hawkes, to win the mixed doubles tennis title at the 1928 Australian Championships.

Originally this final (as well as men's singles and men's doubles finals) was scheduled to be played on Saturday, February 4. As the tournament progressed, it turned out that Borotra would have been engaged in all three of them. He refused to play three matches in one day and wished to forfeit in mixed doubles event. This was not agreed to by the committee and his semi-final and subsequent final mixed doubles matches were postponed until Monday, February 6. Unfortunately, Miss Boyd, who had been in Sydney for a fortnight (as the women's events have begun on 21 January), could not arrange to remain longer and had to scratch.

Both Miss Akhurst and Jean Borotra completed a Triple Crown achievement, having already won their singles and doubles titles.

Seeds

  Esna Boyd /  Jack Hawkes (final)
  Daphne Akhurst /  Jean Borotra (champions)
  Sylvia Harper /  Jacques Brugnon (semifinals)
  Louie Bickerton /  Christian Boussus (semifinals)

Draw

Finals

Earlier rounds

Section 1

Section 2

Notes

 Most likely Flora Rowe, mother of Ernest Rowe.

References

External links
Source for seedings
Source for the draw

1928 in Australian tennis
Mixed Doubles